Farnell is a village in Angus, Scotland. It lies 2 miles south of the River South Esk, between Brechin and Montrose, near Kinnaird Castle.

References

Villages in Angus, Scotland